Hemicrepidius ruficornis is a species of click beetle belonging to the family Elateridae.

References

Beetles described in 1837
Taxa named by William Kirby (entomologist)